Syzygium abatakum is a species of plant in the family Myrtaceae. It is locally known as kalek jambu (in Minangkabau) or kilat jambu. It is native to Sumatra.

The leaves are oppositely arranged, and white flowers are borne on a terminal panicle/corymb. The fruits have not been observed. It most closely resembles Syzygium pyrifolium and Syzygium angbahsin.

References

abatakum